Sir Roger Palmer KB (1577–1657) was an English politician who sat in the House of Commons  at various times between 1614 and 1644. He supported the Royalist cause in the English Civil War.

Palmer was the second son of Sir Thomas Palmer, 1st Baronet of Wingham, Kent and the elder brother of James Palmer, MP.

He was Cup bearer to Henry and Charles, Princes of Wales.  In 1614, 1624 and 1625 he was elected Member of Parliament for Queenborough.

He was knighted KB at the coronation of Charles I in February 1626 and was Master of the Household to King Charles from 1626 to 1632. He was re-elected MP for Queenborough in 1626 and 1628 and sat until 1629 when King Charles decided to rule without parliament for eleven years.

In November 1642, Palmer was elected Member of Parliament for Newton in the Long Parliament to replace Peter Legh, who was killed in a duel.  He supported the King and was disabled from sitting on 22 Jan 1644.

References

 

1577 births
1657 deaths
English MPs 1614
English MPs 1624–1625
English MPs 1625
English MPs 1626
English MPs 1628–1629
English MPs 1640–1648
Masters of the Household
Younger sons of baronets
People from Wingham, Kent